A tabula ansata or tabella ansata (Latin for "tablet with handles", plural tabulae ansatae or tabellae ansatae) is a tablet with dovetail handles. It was a favorite form for votive tablets in Imperial Rome.

Overview
Tabulae ansatae identifying soldiers' units have been found on the tegimenta (leather covers) of shields, for example in Vindonissa (Windisch, Switzerland). Sculptural evidence, for example on the metopes from the Tropaeum Traiani (Adamclisi, Romania), shows that they were also used for the
same purpose on the shields.

Modern era
Tabulae ansatae have been used by modern artists from as early as the 15th century, as shown on the tomb of Charles, Count of Maine, attributed to Francesco Laurana, in Le Mans Cathedral.
The Statue of Liberty by sculptor Auguste Bartholdi is holding one such tablet on which "July IV MDCCLXXVI" is inscribed.

Gallery

Footnotes

External links

 Ancient tabula ansata made of metal from Italica (Spain).
 Tabula ansata on the Shaykh Zwaydah (Cheikh Zouède) mosaic (source page), 4th century AD, Ismailia museum, Egypt, discovered in 1913 by Jean Clédat

Ancient Roman metalwork
Inscriptions